The live sharksucker or slender sharksucker (Echeneis naucrates) is a species of marine fish in the family Echeneidae, the remoras.

Distribution and habitat
The species is considered as circumtropical, as it occurs in all tropical and warm temperate waters around the world, except for the eastern Pacific.

A live sharksucker is known to attach itself temporarily by its modified dorsal fin used as a sucking disc to various hosts, such as sharks, rays, large bony fishes, sea turtles, whales, dolphins, ships, and even sometimes scubadivers.

Description

E. naucrates is a medium-sized fish which can grow up to  length. Its body is elongated and streamlined, and its lower jaw is clearly prognathic (it projects forward well beyond the upper jaw). The jaws, vomer and tongue have villiform teeth.
The main distinctive feature to distinguish from other fishes is the oval-shaped sucking disc, which is a highly modified dorsal fin positioned from the top of the head to the anterior part of the body.

The body background colouration is dark grey to dark brown, with a dark belly. A longitudinal stripe runs along the axis side of the body, it is always darker than its background colour with a whitish margin.
The caudal fin is black with white corners.

Diet
The remora's diet varies according to its maturity or situation (with host or not).

As a juvenile, it sometimes acts as a cleaner fish on reef station and its diet consists of small parasitic crustaceans living on the fishes' bodies, like copepods, isopods, and ostracods.

With a host, the live sharksucker eats parasitic crustaceans from the latter, food scraps from the feeding activity of its host, or some small food caught by filtering the water through its villiform teeth while the navigating on its host.

Without a host, the fish stays close to the shore and can aggregate with other individuals; its diet is then composed of free-living crustaceans, squid, and small fishes.

References

External links

 Echeneis naucrates at Australian Museum.
 Echeneis naucrates at Encyclopedia of Life.
 

live sharksucker
Fishing techniques and methods
Pantropical fish
live sharksucker
live sharksucker